The Astilleros y Maestranzas de la Armada (English: Shipyards and Maestranzas of the Navy), better known by the acronym ASMAR, is a Chilean state-owned shipbuilding company with autonomous administration, which provides services to the Chilean Navy, mainly, and also to other domestic and foreign customers. Its predecessor was Arsenales de Marina, created in 1895, until it was restructured and adopted its current name on April 6, 1960.

It is the largest and most important shipbuilding and repair company in Chile, with three facilities located in Valparaíso, Talcahuano and Punta Arenas. The company's registered office is in Valparaíso, while its main plant is in Talcahuano.

Relevant products

Amphibious and transport ships

Warship

Patrol vessels

Hospital ship

Research ships

Other products
 Floating docks
 Drillship
 Fishing vessels
 Fénix capsules
 Ventilators

Future products
 Antartica 1
 Project Escotillón IV
 Future Chilean frigate

Gallery

See also
 List of shipyards in Chile
 List of active ships of the Chilean Navy
 List of decommissioned ships of the Chilean Navy
 Plan Nacional Continuo de Construcción Naval

References

Sources

External links

  
  

Shipyards of Chile
Defence companies of Chile
Government-owned companies of Chile
Manufacturing companies established in 1960
Chilean companies established in 1960